Cariboo—Chilcotin was a federal electoral district in British Columbia, Canada, that was represented in the  House of Commons from 1979 to 2003.

Geography 

It consisted initially of:
 the Cariboo Regional District;
 the Squamish–Lillooet Regional District; and
 the part of the Thompson–Nicola Regional District west of Electoral Areas C, J, M and N.

In 1987, it was redefined to consist of:
 the Cariboo Regional District;
 the part of the Thompson–Nicola Regional District lying to the west of the east boundaries of Electoral Area E and I;
 Electoral Areas A and B of the Squamish–Lillooet Regional District; and
 the Village of Lillooet.

In 1996, it was redefined to consist of:
 Cariboo Regional District;
 Subdivision D of Thompson–Nicola Regional District, including Spatsum Indian Reserve No. 11, excepting: Logan Lake District Municipality; Skeetchestn Indian Reserve and Nooaitch Indian Reserve No. 10;
 Subdivision A of Squamish–Lillooet Regional District, excepting Nequatque Indian Reserve No. 1;
 the southeast part of Central Coast Regional District.

History 
This riding was created in 1976 from parts of Coast Chilcotin, Fraser Valley East, Kamloops–Cariboo and Skeena ridings.

This district was eliminated as a result of redistribution in 2003. Parts of it went to Cariboo–Prince George, Kamloops–Thompson and Chilliwack–Fraser Canyon ridings.

Members of Parliament

Election results

See also 

 List of Canadian federal electoral districts
 Past Canadian electoral districts

External links 
 Expenditures – 2000
 Expenditures – 1997
 Election results from the Library of Parliament

Former federal electoral districts of British Columbia